Presidential elections were held for the first time in Kyrgyzstan on 13 October 1991. The only candidate was Askar Akayev, who won 95.4% of the vote. Voter turnout reported to be 89.0%.

Results

References

1991
1991 in Kyrgyzstan
Kyrgyzstan
Single-candidate elections
October 1991 events in Asia